Listafjorden is a widely shaped fjord (or bay) between the island of Hidra and the Lista peninsula in Agder county, Norway. The fjord is located in the municipalities Farsund and Flekkefjord. The fjord heads inland and right after it passes the island of Andabeløya, it splits in two branches: the Fedafjorden and the Stolsfjorden.

References

Fjords of Agder
Farsund
Flekkefjord